Helena Cronin (born 1942) is a British Darwinian philosopher and rationalist. She is the co-director of the Centre for Philosophy of Natural and Social Science and the Darwin Centre at the London School of Economics. Cronin's important work is The Ant and the Peacock: Altruism and Sexual Selection from Darwin to Today (1991).

Life and work

Cronin attended Henrietta Barnett School in Hampstead Garden Suburb.

Cronin is co-editor of Darwinism Today, a series of short books in evolutionary theory. She writes popular articles for newspapers such as The Guardian. She is a Patron of Humanists UK.

She ran a series of seminars, "effectively a salon at the London School of Economics specialising in the implications of Darwinian theory for humans" according to Times Higher Education. The seminars featured Richard Dawkins, David Haig, Daniel Dennett, Steven Pinker and Matt Ridley among others.

Cronin was acknowledged in the preface to the second edition of 'The Selfish Gene' by Richard Dawkins.

Reception

The evolutionary zoologist Mark Ridley, reviewing The Ant and the Peacock in the New York Times, writes that it is a "fine book" in which Cronin uses our modern understanding of altruism (the ant) and "dangerously gaudy sexual ornamentation" (the peacock). Ridley notes that there are two reasons for sex differences like the peacock's train, and that Cronin explains them through the debate of Charles Darwin and Alfred Russel Wallace. Darwin proposed female choice: female aesthetics drive male displays. Wallace both "ignored Darwin's problem" (ornamentation) and "denied Darwin's solution" (female choice rather than natural selection). In Ridley's opinion, "The subtlest and most original insights in "The Ant and the Peacock" concern differences between Darwin's ideas and modern ideas." The review of The Ant and the Peacock in Biology and Philosophy was favorable."

Nils K. Oeijord, in his book Why Gould was Wrong, noted that Stephen Jay Gould Gould's criticism of Cronin was misplaced. John Maynard Smith and Daniel Dennett defended Cronin against Gould's charges.

The English evolutionary anthropologist Camilla Power, in A reply to Helena Cronin criticized Cronin's claim that women are disposed to wanting a single mate, noting that monogamy is rarer than biologists thought. Power was critical of Cronin's view of the lone mother, showing that grandmothers assist their daughters' offspring.

Edge, in its "Annual Question" in 2008, hosted Cronin in a piece entitled More dumbbells but more Nobels: Why men are at the top

Bibliography

 The Ant and the Peacock: Altruism and Sexual Selection from Darwin to Today Cambridge University Press,  1991.
 The Battle of the Sexes Revisited, in Richard Dawkins: how a scientist changed the way we think. Oxford University Press, 2006.

References

External links
 Official website 
  "Getting Human Nature Right" A Talk With Helena Cronin, Edge org 29 August 2000
 Excerpts from The Ant and the Peacock

1942 births
20th-century anthropologists
20th-century British non-fiction writers
20th-century British philosophers
20th-century essayists
21st-century anthropologists
21st-century British non-fiction writers
21st-century British philosophers
21st-century essayists
Analytic philosophers
British anthropologists
British women anthropologists
British humanists
British women essayists
British women non-fiction writers
British women philosophers
Charles Darwin biographers
Living people
People educated at Henrietta Barnett School
Philosophers of culture
Philosophers of sexuality
Philosophers of science
Philosophers of social science
Philosophy writers
Rationalists
Social philosophers
Theorists on Western civilization